Mohamed Bensaid Ait Idder (– born 1 July 1925) is a Moroccan politician and activist. Ait Idder started his activism first against French Protectorate in Morocco, and was one of the founders and leaders of the Moroccan Army of Liberation. After Morocco's independence, Ait Idder opposed the system in place, especially the king Hassan II.

Bensaid Ait Idder was co-founder of several leftist political movements and parties in the independent Morocco, including:National Union of Popular Forces, Harakat 23 Mars, Organization for the Popular Democratic Action and the Unified Socialist Party.

Early life
Mohamed Bensaid Ait Idder was born in 1925 in Tin Mansour, in the Berber-speaking province of Chtouka Aït Baha, in Sous, Morocco. After finishing his primary studies, he moved to Marrakesh in 1945 to start university studies. There, he adopted nationalistic ideas and worked together with anti-colonial activists in Marrakesh, including Abdallah Ibrahim and Mohamed Basri.

Political Activism
 In 1955, Bensaid Ait Idder joined the Moroccan Army of Liberation in the south, and started participating in the armed resistance against the French and Spanish forces in Morocco. Their efforts were crushed after the Operation Écouvillon in 1958.
 In 1959, Ait Idder, together with several modernist activists, left the Istiqlal Party and participated in the creation of the National Union of Popular Forces.
 In 1963, and after the July 1963 Conspiracy, Bensaid Ait Idder was condemned to death. He escaped to Algeria at that time.
 Following the 1965 Moroccan riots, Ait Idder founded with several Marxist–Leninist activists the Harakat 23 Mars, a movement spreading revolutionary ideas in Morocco.
 In 1981 Ait Idder received a royal pardon and came back to Morocco, where he founded the Organization for the Popular Democratic Action party, that was a legal party, and with which he sat in the parliament from 1984 to 2007.
 In 2002, the Organization for the Popular Democratic Action merged with several leftist parties to create the Unified Socialist Party, for which Bensaid Ait Idder is an emblematic figure until today.
 In 2015, Ait Idder received a royal distinction from the King Mohamed VI.

Books
In 2001, Mohamed Bensaid Ait Idder published a book entitled Epic pages of the Liberation Army in the Moroccan South, relating his experience with the Moroccan Liberation Army between 1955 and 1958.

References

1925 births
Living people
Berber rebels
Moroccan Berber politicians
Moroccan dissidents
Moroccan exiles
Moroccan independence activists
Moroccan revolutionaries
Shilha people
People from Souss-Massa